Poul Holm (20 July 1888 – 29 October 1964) was a Danish sportsman. He competed in the gymnastics and freestyle swimming events at the 1908 Summer Olympics.

References

External links
 

1888 births
1964 deaths
Danish male artistic gymnasts
Danish male freestyle swimmers
Olympic gymnasts of Denmark
Olympic swimmers of Denmark
Gymnasts at the 1908 Summer Olympics
Swimmers at the 1908 Summer Olympics
Sportspeople from Copenhagen